Andrew Richardson may refer to:

Andrew Richardson (Jamaican cricketer) (born 1981), West Indian cricketer
Andrew Richardson (judoka) (born 1955), Australian Olympic judoka
Andrew Richardson (tennis) (born 1974), British tennis player
Andy Richardson (sports correspondent), sports presenter/correspondent for Al Jazeera English
Andy Richardson (writer), British writer